Miss Universe Dominicana 2000 was held on March 25, 2000. There were 54 candidates, representing provinces and municipalities, who entered. The winner would represent the Dominican Republic at Miss Universe 2000. The Miss Mundo Dominicana would enter Miss World 2000. The Miss Internacional Dominicana would enter in Miss International 2000. The first runner-up would enter in Miss Tropical International 2000. The second runner-up would enter in Reinado Internacional del Café 2000. The rest of finalists entered different pageants. This edition would be the last edition to select Top 20 quarter finalist in the history of Miss Dominican Republic.

Results

Delegates

External links
http://dr1.com/news/2000/dnews032700.shtml

Miss Dominican Republic
2000 beauty pageants
2000 in the Dominican Republic